Rebel Soul may refer to:

 Rebel Soul (Bonfire album), 1997
 Rebel Soul (Kid Rock album), 2012
 "Rebel Soul", a song by Bis from the album The New Transistor Heroes
 "Rebel Soul", a song by Gotthard from the album Need to Believe